Jérémy Huyghebaert (born 7 January 1989) is a Belgian footballer who plays as a left back for Romanian Liga I club FC U Craiova 1948. In his career, Huyghebaert also played for teams such as R.E. Mouscron, Roeselare, WS Bruxelles or Excel Mouscron, among others.

Honours
RWS Bruxelles
Belgian Second Division: 2015–16
FC U Craiova
Liga II: 2020–21

References

External links

1989 births
Living people
People from Mouscron
Belgian footballers
Belgium youth international footballers
Belgium under-21 international footballers
Association football defenders
Belgian Pro League players
Challenger Pro League players
R.E. Mouscron players
K.S.V. Roeselare players
K.V. Mechelen players
Royal Excel Mouscron players
RWS Bruxelles players
Ligue 1 players
AJ Auxerre players
Swiss Super League players
Neuchâtel Xamax FCS players
Liga I players
Liga II players
FC U Craiova 1948 players
Belgian expatriate footballers
Belgian expatriate sportspeople in France
Expatriate footballers in France
Belgian expatriate sportspeople in Switzerland
Expatriate footballers in Switzerland
Belgian expatriate sportspeople in Romania
Expatriate footballers in Romania
Footballers from Hainaut (province)